Gastralia (singular gastralium) are dermal bones found in the ventral body wall of modern crocodilians and tuatara, and many prehistoric tetrapods. They are found between the sternum and pelvis, and do not articulate with the vertebrae. In these reptiles, gastralia provide support for the abdomen and attachment sites for abdominal muscles.

The possession of gastralia may be ancestral for Tetrapoda and were possibly derived from the ventral scales found in animals like rhipidistians, labyrinthodonts, and Acanthostega, and may be related to ventral elements of turtle plastrons.
Similar, but not homologous cartilagenous elements, are found in the ventral body walls of lizards and anurans. These structures have been referred to as inscriptional ribs, based on their alleged association with the inscriptiones tendinae (the tendons that form the six pack in humans). However, the terminology for these gastral-like structures remains confused. Both types, along with sternal ribs (ossified costal cartilages), have been referred to as abdominal ribs, a term with limited usefulness that should be avoided.
Gastralia are also present in a variety of extinct animals, including theropod and prosauropod dinosaurs, pterosaurs, plesiosaurs, choristoderes and some primitive pelycosaurs.  In dinosaurs, the elements articulate with each other in a sort of zig-zag along the midline and may have aided in respiration. Gastralia are known to be present in primitive ornithischian and sauropodomorph dinosaurs. However gastralia are only known from heterodontosaurid ornithschians, and gastralia are lost in eusauropodan sauropods.

Discoveries about how the gastralia fit together in the skeleton of Sue the T. rex have led to an understanding that Tyrannosaurus bodies were more barrel-chested – and heavier – than previously thought.

Pathology 
The Allosaurus fragilis specimen USNM 8367 contained several gastralia which preserve evidence of healed fractures near their middle. Some of the fractures were poorly healed and "formed pseudoarthroses." An apparent subadult male Allosaurus fragilis was reported by Laws to have extensive pathologies. The possible subadult A. jimmadseni specimen MOR 693 also had pathological gastralia. The left scapula and fibula of an Allosaurus fragilis specimen catalogued as USNM 4734 are both pathological, both probably due to healed fractures.

The holotype of Neovenator salerii had many pathologies, including pseudoarthrotic gastralia and a deviation to the right of the third and fourth neural spines of the neck vertebrae.

An immature dromaeosaurid specimen (which hadn't been described in the scientific literature as of 2001) from Tugrugeen Shireh  was observed to have a "bifurcated" gastralium.

In the Gorgosaurus libratus holotype (NMC 2120) the 13th and 14th gastralia have healed fractures. Another G. libratus specimen catalogued as TMP94.12.602 bears multiple pathologies, including a pseudoarthortic gastralium.

The unidentified tyrannosaurid specimen TMP97.12.229 had a fractured and healed gastralium.

References

External links 
Dinosaur gastralia and their function in respiration

Vertebrate anatomy
Skeletal system
Thorax (human anatomy)